Moonraker is the soundtrack for the eleventh James Bond film of the same name.

Moonraker was the third of the three Bond films for which the theme song was performed by Shirley Bassey. Frank Sinatra was considered for the vocals, before Johnny Mathis was approached and offered the opportunity. Mathis was unhappy about the song and withdrew from the project, leaving the producers scrambling for a replacement. Kate Bush declined as she was due to embark on her British tour, so John Barry offered the song to Bassey just weeks before the release date. As a result, Bassey made the recordings at very short notice and never regarded the song 'as her own' as she had never had the chance to perform it or promote it first. Indeed, Bassey has seldom performed the song live in comparison to her other two Bond themes, "Goldfinger" and "Diamonds Are Forever". The film uses two versions of the title theme song, a ballad version heard over the main titles, and a disco version for the end titles. Confusingly, the United Artists single release labelled the tracks on the 7" single as "Moonraker (Main Title)" for the version used to close the film and "Moonraker (End Title)" for the track that opened the film. The song failed to make any real impact on the charts, which may partly be attributed to Bassey's failure to promote the single, given the last minute decision and the way in which it was quickly recorded to meet the schedule.

Composition 
As with "We Have All the Time in the World" in 1969, Hal David wrote the lyrics. Paul Williams's original lyrics were discarded.

Finally in 2005, Bassey sang the song for the first time outside James Bond on stage as part of a medley of her three Bond title songs. An instrumental strings version of the title theme was used in 2007 tourism commercials for the Dominican Republic.

The score for Moonraker marked a turning point in Barry's output, abandoning the Kentonesque brass of his earlier Bond scores and instead scoring the film with slow, rich string passages—a trend which Barry would continue in the 1980s with scores such as Raise the Titanic, Out of Africa and Somewhere in Time.

Moonraker uses for the first time since Diamonds Are Forever a piece of music called "007" (briefly, and late in track 7, "Bond Arrives in Rio and Boat Chase"), the secondary Bond theme composed by Barry which was introduced in From Russia with Love. This is the only time when the "007 Theme" is used in a Roger Moore Bond film; it is as of 2021 the last time it has been heard in a Bond film. Another link between the soundtracks of Moonraker and Diamonds Are Forever is the inclusion of a track titled "Bond Smells a Rat". The two tracks are not related to each other.

Unusually, the score was recorded in Paris—all of Barry's previous Bond scores had been recorded at London's CTS Studios. The film's production base was in France and it was decided the film would be scored there as well. Like some Bond films, the score for Moonraker has never received an extended release. The soundtrack is the only official one not to contain the "James Bond Theme".

Track listing
 "Moonraker (Main Title)" – Shirley Bassey  (3:10)
 "Space Lazer Battle"  (2:47)
 "Miss Goodhead Meets Bond"  (2:48)
 "Cable Car and Snake Fight"  (3:07)
 "Bond Lured to Pyramid"  (2:02)
 "Flight into Space"  (6:27)
 "Bond Arrives in Rio and Boat Chase"  (2:38)
 "Centrifuge and Corrine Put Down"  (2:35)
 "Bond Smells a Rat"  (2:24)
 "Moonraker (End Title)" – Shirley Bassey  (2:27)

Some familiar pieces of music also appear in the film:
 Frédéric Chopin's Prelude no. 15 in D-flat major (op. 28), "Raindrop"): Drax playing a piano when Bond arrives.
 Richard Strauss' "Also sprach Zarathustra" (op. 30) (associated with 2001: A Space Odyssey): a hunting horn plays its distinctive first three notes.
 Tritsch-Tratsch-Polka by Johann Strauss II: during the hovercraft scene on Saint Mark's square.
 The alien-contacting theme Wild Notes from Close Encounters of the Third Kind: as the key-code for a security door.
 Tchaikovsky's Romeo and Juliet Overture: when Jaws meets Dolly.
 Elmer Bernstein's theme from The Magnificent Seven: when Bond appears on horseback in gaucho clothing.

In popular culture
 The main title's opening notes were used in a 2007 tourism commercial for the Dominican Republic.

See also
 Outline of James Bond

References

Soundtrack albums from James Bond films
Soundtrack
1979 soundtrack albums
EMI Records soundtracks
John Barry (composer) soundtracks